Who We Touch is the eleventh album by British alternative rock band The Charlatans, released on 6 September 2010. It was released in a standard version and a two disc version. The second CD contained early demos, alternate mixes of tracks from the standard album, and some out-takes that didn't make it on to the album. The album charted at #21 in the UK album charts. The album was later released digitally.

This is the Charlatans' final studio album to feature drummer Jon Brookes, who was absent from the band's tour supporting the album due to getting treatment for a brain tumour. He was replaced on the tour by The Verve drummer Peter Salisbury; Brookes subsequently died in 2013.

Reception

You Cross My Path was met with generally favourable reviews from music critics. At Metacritic, which assigns a normalized rating out of 100 to reviews from mainstream publications, the album received an average score of 71, based on 12 reviews. AnyDecentMusic? gave it a score of 6.3, based on 15 reviews.

Track listing
All songs written by The Charlatans except "I Sing the Body Eclectic", written by The Charlatans and Penny Rimbaud.

Deluxe Edition
Disc One Same as 10-track version

Disc Two (bonus disc)

Personnel
The Charlatans
Tim Burgess – lead vocals, mixing
Mark Collins – guitars
Martin Blunt – bass guitar
Jon Brookes – drums
Tony Rogers – keyboards, backing vocals

Additional personnel
Jay Shulman – viola
Jonathon Talbott – violin
Penny Rimbaud – poem, vocals on "I Sing the Body Eclectic"

Production
Martin "Youth" Glover – production
Tim Bran, Clive Goddard – engineering
Cameron Jenkins, Henry Hirsch – mixing
Chris Theis – Pro Tools engineer (assisted by Bram Tobey)
Nigel Walton – mastering
Jazz Summers, Tim Parry – management
Gee Vaucher – cover art and design
Tom Sheehan – band photo

References

External links

Who We Touch at YouTube (streamed copy where licensed)

2010 albums
The Charlatans (English band) albums
Albums produced by Youth (musician)
Cooking Vinyl albums